Where We Stand is the second studio album by American rock band Yellowcard. It was released in 1999 (and re-released in 2004 and 2005). It was released by Takeover Records, a label created by one of the band's guitarists, Ben Harper.  This is the last release to feature vocalist Ben Dobson, whose position would later be taken over by guitarist/vocalist Ryan Key. The songs "Sue" and "Uphill Both Ways" were re-recorded, originally appearing on Yellowcard's first extended play, Midget Tossing.

Track listing

Personnel 
 Ben Dobson — lead vocals
 Benjamin Harper — lead guitar
 Sean Mackin — violin, backing vocals
 Todd Clary – guitar
 Warren Cooke – bass guitar
 Longineu W. Parsons III — drums

References 

Yellowcard albums
1999 albums
Hardcore punk albums by American artists